The Tower of Power is a , 120,000 watt TPO mast owned by the GMA Network located in Tandang Sora, Barangay Culiat, Quezon City. It serves as a transmitter facility for GMA's flagship stations, including DZBB-TV 7 (digital UHF 15), GTV's DWDB-TV 27, and Barangay FM's DWLS 97.1 MHz.

History
The Tower of Power was constructed on a huge vacant lot in the 3rd Quarter of 1987, as a new edifice for the network and for the preparation for Rainbow Satellite broadcast to replace an old surplus 50-kilowatt transmitter located at the old RBS building (now known as GMA Network Center) along EDSA, and to provide clearer TV and FM reception. The tower's construction uses  of steel from a local steel mill, costing  for the building of this tower. Antennas are also provided to enhance signal strength. After several months of planning, the tower completed in October 1988 and on November 7, the tower was opened by then-President Corazon Aquino and the GMA Network board of directors. A grand TV special was started after the inauguration. The slogan GMA-7-POWER was used from November 7 to December 1 of that year as a station ID. During its first decade of operations, GMA operated with 50,000 watts of transmitter power output, until in 1998 when GMA finally upgraded to its current 120-kilowatt capacity, which broadcasts at an astounding 100,000 watts of transmitter power output.

In 2005, following its signing of a channel lease agreement with ZOE Broadcasting Network's flagship DZOE-TV 11, GMA replaced channel 11's decommissioned 40-kilowatt transmitter in Pasig with a newly purchased 100 kW transmitter system built and installed by GMA. Since channel 7's technical staff is prohibited by law from operating channel 11 due to the fact that both stations are in the same VHF channel band, the Tower of Power site leased portions of its space to Zoe for its own technical team to operate and maintain channel 11's signal. ZOE's 14-year lease in the site ended in mid-2019 following GMA's decision not to renew the agreement amid the company's increasing lease payment obligations to channel 11's owners. ZOE's 100 kW transmitter equipment was later transferred to its own compound in Antipolo, which was eventually reused when channel 11 was relaunched as A2Z Channel 11 under a blocktime agreement with erstwhile rival network ABS-CBN in October 2020.

Features

The tower
The Tower of Power uses its high-gain corner reflector antennas and UHF panel antennas to produce a wide coverage of Analog (VHF TV and UHF TV, using the NTSC format) and Digital (ISDB-T) TV reception in Metro Manila, Region 3 (Central Luzon) and 4-A (Calabarzon). It is including Bulacan, Pampanga, Zambales, Tarlac, Bataan, Nueva Ecija, Laguna, Batangas, Cavite, Quezon, Aurora and Rizal in both grades A and B for the broadcasts of DZBB-TV and DWDB-TV.

For FM radio, DWLS's signal strength utilized by a circular bay Jampro FM antenna provides listeners with clear FM reception of 25 kilowatts and to spread out in Metro Manila and nearby provinces as well.

It also serves as a repeater of GTV for transmissions in Cebu and Davao to relay Channel 27's programs.

The transmitter facility
The transmitter facility houses television and FM radio transmitters for DZBB-TV, DWDB-TV and DWLS containing sets of transmitter equipment imported by Harris and RCA of the United States, and JVC of Japan. At the same time, the satellite downlink facility housed all satellite broadcasts directly to the United States and other countries to produce foreign programmes.

Frequencies

Radio stations

FM stations

Analog television

Digital television

References

See also
Lattice tower
GMA Network Inc.
DZBB-TV
DWLS
DWDB-TV
Millennium Transmitter
List of famous transmission sites
List of tallest towers in the world

Lattice towers
GMA Network (company)
Towers completed in 1988
Broadcast transmitters
Buildings and structures in Quezon City
Transmitter sites in the Philippines